Jervis B. Webb Company is a global company that designs, engineers, installs and supports integrated material handling systems such as baggage handling systems, Automatic Guided Vehicles (AGVs), conveyor systems and Automated Storage and Retrieval Systems (AS/RS). Webb is a subsidiary of Daifuku Co., Ltd.

The company headquarters is in Novi, Michigan, with offices and manufacturing plants internationally including Carlisle, South Carolina; Harbor Springs, Michigan; Boyne City, Michigan; Hamilton, Ontario; Northampton, England; Ludwigshafen, Germany; Palaiseau, France; Barcelona, Spain; Shanghai, China and Bangalore, India.

Products
Products manufactured by the company include:
 Automatic Guided Vehicles (AGVs) - mobile robots used in industrial applications to move materials around manufacturing facilities and warehouses
 Baggage Handling Systems (BHS), a type of conveyor system installed in airports that transports checked luggage from ticket counters through security screening machines to areas where the bags can be loaded onto airplanes. A BHS also transports incoming checked baggage from airplanes to baggage claim areas or to an area where bags can be loaded onto another airplane.
 Conveyors – Conveyor  systems move materials from one location to another along a fixed path.  Different types of conveyors have been developed for specific applications, such as moving light or heavy loads, moving products through paint processing and moving materials along an assembly line.
 Automated Storage and Retrieval Systems (often referred to as AS/RS), a variety of computer-controlled methods for automatically depositing and retrieving loads from defined storage locations
 SmartCart - also known as AGC, which can move products on an assembly line or transport goods throughout a plant or warehouse. AGCs can move small and large loads along a magnetic tape throughout the working area. Other products can be added to AGCs such as longer tape to enable larger work areas or larger AGCs for larger loads. Production rates can be modified by adding or removing AGCs from production.

Acquisitions
Logan Teleflex, 2011
Elite Line Services, 2013

Awards
 U.S. Silica Co., $290,000 contract to manufacture eight belt conveyors
Chrysler Group awards Jervis B. Webb New business to construct state-of-the-art material handling system at St. Louis plant
$18 Million in Florida Airport Projects
Jervis B. Webb Company, Michigans Cool Place to Work
State-of-the-Art Power & Free and Skid Conveyor Systems at Ford’s Oakville Assembly Complex in Ontario, Canada
$14 Million Baggage Handling System at Port Columbus International Airport
 Dallas Love Field Baggage Handling System as a part of a $519 million modernization of a Dallas airport

Patents
U.S. Patent No. 7,991,521 for its Variable Path for Automated Guided Vehicle
U.S. Patent No. 7,980,808 for its Automatic Transport Loading System and Method

References
Malis, Carol Michigan Celebrating A Century of Success Cherbo Publishing Group, Inc. 1999. pp. 124–125

Technology companies established in 1919
Companies based in Oakland County, Michigan
Manufacturing companies based in Michigan
1919 establishments in Michigan